The Ministry of Emergency Situations of Azerbaijan Republic is the central executive body within the cabinet of Azerbaijan Republic responsible for protecting the population from natural and manmade disasters. The ministry is headed by Kamaladdin Heydarov.

Legislation 
Civil Defence of the Republic of Azerbaijan is controlled by the Law “About Civil Defence”, which was introduced by the Decree of the President of the Republic of Azerbaijan in 1998. In accordance with this law the Cabinet of the Republic has issued the Decision “ About the Provisions of Civil Defence” and approved normative documents.

Activities 
Protection of the population and territories from emergency situations, fire, water hazards. Securing the mining industry, to ensure the security of petroleum and petroleum products, accidents with established emergency prevention and mitigation, material resources, public funds in public places and to ensure implementation of policies and regulations developed.

Regulations 
In order to organize control in different in scale emergencies the decisions are done centralized or at the local level. The Civil Defence Organization of Azerbaijan has been restructured under the authority of the Ministry of Emergency Situations.

Organization 
According to the requirements of legislation “About the Civil Defence” all government bodies (central and local), industrial installations of different property rights have “Plans of Civil Defence”. These are programs for fires, earthquakes, radioactive and chemical contamination, military conflict, etc. Control and execution of protective measures in emergencies is responsibility of Government of the Republic, central and local executive bodies, leaders of installations. Civil Defence Department of the Ministry of Defence of the Republic of Azerbaijan cooperates with the Community of Independent States (CIS) and the International Civil Defence Organization (ICDO).

Structure 
The structure of the Ministry includes:

 State Fire Service
 State Fire Control Service
 Troops of the Civil Defence
 State Agency of Stock
 The State Agency for Control over the safety of construction
 Agency for the safe conduct of work in industry and mining control
 State Inspection for low-intensive ships
 State Water Reserves Agency
 Special Risky Rescue Service
 Rescue Service of the Caspian Basin
 Crisis Management Center
 State Agency on Nuclear and Radiological Activity Regulation (SANRAR)

 Special Works "Isotope"
 Operative Investigation Department
 Material-Technical Supply Department
 Central Laboratory
 Ambulance rescue
 Office of Capital Construction
 Aviation Detachment
 Training Center
 Fitness Club
 Medical Service
 Regional Centers
Academy of the Ministry of Emergency Situations

State Fire Service 
The State Fire Service is responsible for protecting the population the Republic of Azerbaijan and their properties by providing necessary means in order to stop unwanted fires. Within its competence, it tends to organize divisions (it also could be voluntary from local population) for overcoming the obstacles resulted from fire.

State Fire Control Service 
The SFCS as an executive body monitors regulations and orders related to the fire safety. If it is necessary to certificate goods and services in the mentioned field. Additionally, it supervises mandatory fire insurance of properties of the people that involved in business related activities.

State Agency of Stock 
The State Agency of Stock involves in the process of storing reserves for guaranteeing the security of the state in the case of emergent circumstances. By following the state policy of the Republic of Azerbaijan, the service attends in arrangement of and management on state material reserves. The tasks of international humanitarian aids are implemented by this branch of the ministry.

State Agency for Control over the safety of construction 
The State Agency for Control over the safety of construction observes implementation of state policy related to safety requirements in all areas of construction activity. Within its authority defined by the legislation, it carries out state control in this field in the country.

Agency for the safe conduct of work in industry and mining control 
The service mainly focuses on providing security in industry and mountain-mine related works in order not to encounter technical issues and emergent situation along with the relevant state bodies.

State Water Reserves Agency 
The agency is established to keep the main reservoirs of the state under its control in order to maintain their reserve and structural integrity. It also monitors other surface and groundwater reserves.

State Agency on Nuclear and Radiological Activity Regulation 
The agency ensures that the population and population the territory of the Republic of Azerbaijan are safe from nuclear and radiological activities by exercising defined state policy.

State Inspection for low-intensive ships 
The Service organizes and implements technical supervision of the state control and exploitation of small capacity vessels controls the safety of the operation of small-sized ships' bases. It controls and co-ordinates diving and search activities on the beaches, water basins and other reservoirs, ensuring the safety of people in the water, as well as in search and rescue of people in water basins and other water reserves.

Special Risky Rescue Service 
SRRS established react immediately to emergency circumstances. It organizes special risky search and accident-rescue operations when tries to overcome the consequences of emergency circumstances and provides immediate medical aid to injured population. The protection of strategically important objects, facilities and other enterprises different sources is provided by this service within its authority.

Rescue Service of the Caspian basin 
The service attempts to take measures against disasters and eliminate the emergency circumstances and their outcomes. It also tries to eliminate the consequence of issues related to spill of oil or oil products. The service implements search and rescue operations during emergency situations inside of the territory of the Republic of Azerbaijan and also in Azerbaijan sector of the Caspian Sea.

Operative Investigation Department 
OID carries out initial investigation for finding out the reasons of incidents during emergency situations. The initial legal measures are provided by this service in the case of criminal incidents.

Material-Technical Supply Department 

Material-Technical Supply Department provides logistical supply and technical needs of the Ministry within its authority.

Medical Service 
The medical examination and treatment of the personnel of the Ministry as well as the members of their families are provided by this service. The service has also other duties such as ensuring medical guarantee for recruitment of military units, making predictions on epidemiological circumstances in the areas suffered from disasters, preventing the spread of diseases, etc.

Training 
Training of specialists is done at the Training Centre of Civil Defence and at local courses of Civil Defence.

Academy of the Ministry of Emergency Situations 

The Academy aims to prepare skilled graduate staff for the Ministry and also apply necessary means in order to increase its employees’ qualifications.

International relations 
The Ministry of Emergency Situations in its activity gave special importance to international practice, a great experience on the management of emergency states cooperation pays special attention to the development. The Ministry cooperates with following international organizations: the UN, NATO, OSCE, CIS, GUAM, OPCW, IAEA, and the BSEC. In order to improve skills in the field of emergency situations employees of MES are studying in Russia, Ukraine, Belarus, Germany in the fields of emergency management. These are the countries which ministry cooperates with: the Russian Federation, the United States, Jordan, Turkey, Ukraine, Belarus, France, and Germany. From 24 to 27 September 2007, in Baku MES in cooperation with International Academy of Science developed an international symposium on the theme of "Natural Cataclysms and Global Problems of the Modern Civilization"

References 

Emergency Situations
2005 establishments in Azerbaijan